Central Avenue Historic District can refer to:

 South Central Avenue Historic District (Baltimore)
 Central Avenue Historic District (Hot Springs, Arkansas)
 Central Avenue Historic District (Lancaster, New York)
 Central Avenue Historic District (Queens, New York)
 Central Avenue Historic District (Dayton, Ohio)
 Central Avenue Historic District (Middletown, Ohio)